Battulgyn Oktyabri (born November 7, 1980) is a Mongolian short track speed skater and two-time Olympian.

References

1980 births
Living people
Mongolian male short track speed skaters
Olympic short track speed skaters of Mongolia
Short track speed skaters at the 1998 Winter Olympics
Short track speed skaters at the 2002 Winter Olympics
20th-century Mongolian people